Rolf Bercht (26 April 1925 – 22 September 2012) was a Brazilian sailor. He competed in the 12m² Sharpie event at the 1956 Summer Olympics.

References

External links
 

1925 births
2012 deaths
Brazilian male sailors (sport)
Olympic sailors of Brazil
Sailors at the 1956 Summer Olympics – 12 m2 Sharpie
Sportspeople from Porto Alegre